Chizuko Tanaka  is a Japanese athlete.  She won the gold medal in  the 800 metres event in the 1962 Asian Games.

References

Athletes (track and field) at the 1962 Asian Games
Asian Games gold medalists for Japan
Asian Games medalists in athletics (track and field)
Medalists at the 1962 Asian Games
Japanese female middle-distance runners